The String Quartet No. 8 (D 112) in B-flat major was composed by Franz Schubert in 1814. It was posthumously published as Op. 168.

Movements
 Allegro ma non troppo (B-flat major)
 Andante sostenuto (G minor)
 Menuetto: Allegro (E-flat major, with Trio in E-flat major)
 Presto (B-flat major)

Sources
 Franz Schubert's Works, Series V: Streichquartette edited by Joseph Hellmesberger and Eusebius Mandyczewski. Breitkopf & Härtel, 1890.
 Otto Erich Deutsch (and others). Schubert Thematic Catalogue (several editions), No. 112.
 New Schubert Edition, Series VI, Volume 4: String Quartets II edited by Werner Aderhold, Bärenreiter, 1994.

External links 
 

String Quartet No. 08
1814 compositions